Neurath's boat (or Neurath's ship) is a simile used in anti-foundational accounts of knowledge, especially in the philosophy of science. It was first formulated by Otto Neurath. It is based in part on the Ship of Theseus which, however, is standardly used to illustrate other philosophical questions, to do with problems of identity. It was popularised by Willard Van Orman Quine in Word and Object (1960).

Neurath used the simile in several occasions, the first being in Neurath's text "Problems in War Economics" (1913). In "Anti-Spengler" (1921) Neurath wrote:

Neurath's non-foundational analogy of reconstructing piecemeal a ship at sea contrasts with Descartes' much earlier foundationalist analogy—in Discourse on the Method (1637) and Meditations on First Philosophy (1641)—of demolishing a building all at once and rebuilding from the ground up. Neurath himself pointed out this contrast.

The boat was replaced by a raft in discussions by some philosophers, such as Paul Lorenzen in 1968, Susan Haack in 1974, and Ernest Sosa in 1980. Lorenzen's use of the simile of the raft was a kind of foundationalist modification of Neurath's original, disagreeing with Neurath by asserting that it is possible to jump into the water and to build a new raft while swimming, i.e., to "start from scratch" to build a new system of knowledge.

Prior to Neurath's simile, Charles Sanders Peirce had used with similar purpose the metaphor of walking on a bog: one only takes another step when the ground beneath one's feet begins to give way.

Neurathian bootstrap
Keith Stanovich, in his book The Robot's Rebellion, refers to it as a Neurathian bootstrap, using bootstrapping as an analogy to the recursive nature of revising one's beliefs. A "rotten plank" on the ship, for instance, might represent a meme virus or a junk meme (i.e., a meme that is either maladaptive to the individual, or serves no beneficial purpose for the realization of an individual's life goals). It may be impossible to bring the ship to shore for repairs, therefore one may stand on planks that are not rotten in order to repair or replace the ones that are. At a later time, the planks previously used for support may be tested by standing on other planks that are not rotten:

In this way, people might proceed to examine and revise their beliefs so as to become more rational.

See also 

 Axiom
 Belief revision
 Cognitive development
 Dialectics
 Falsificationism
 Foundherentism
 Double-loop learning
 Inquiry
 Learning cycle
 Lie-to-children
 Lifelong learning
 Marketplace of ideas
 Rational reconstruction
 Reason maintenance
 Reflective practice
 Scientific method
 Wide reflective equilibrium

References

Metaphors referring to ships
Philosophical analogies
Philosophy of science
Willard Van Orman Quine